The 1914 Bolton by-election was held on 22 September 1914.  The by-election was held due to the death of the incumbent Labour MP, Alfred Gill.  It was won by the Labour candidate Robert Tootill who was unopposed due to a War-time electoral pact.

References

Bolton by-election
Bolton by-election
1910s in Lancashire
Elections in the Metropolitan Borough of Bolton
By-elections to the Parliament of the United Kingdom in Lancashire constituencies
By-elections to the Parliament of the United Kingdom in Greater Manchester constituencies
Unopposed by-elections to the Parliament of the United Kingdom (need citation)
Bolton by-election